Lloyd Bourne (born October 18, 1958) is a former professional tennis player from the United States. Bourne attended St. Francis High School in La Canada, California, transferring to Blair High in Pasadena as a senior. He played for Stanford in college on its NCAA Championship team in 1981.

During his career, Bourne won one doubles titles. He achieved a career-high singles ranking of world No. 71 in 1982 and a career-high doubles ranking of World No. 42 in 1987.

Grand Prix Tour finals

Singles (2 losses)

Doubles (1 win, 1 loss)

External links
 
 

American male tennis players
Tennis players from Los Angeles
Sportspeople from Pasadena, California
Stanford Cardinal men's tennis players
1958 births
Living people